Natalie Jameson is a Canadian politician, who serves as Minister of Education and Lifelong Learning in the Legislative Assembly of Prince Edward Island. She represents the district of Charlottetown-Hillsborough Park as a member of the Progressive Conservative Party of Prince Edward Island.

She was elected approximately three months after the 2019 Prince Edward Island general election in the rest of the province, with the original election in the Charlottetown-Hillsborough Park district having been deferred due to the death of a nominated candidate just a few days before the original election date.

Early life 
Natalie is the daughter of Kevin and Christa Curran of Southdale Avenue and grew up in Hillsborough Park. She attended local schools and later both Holland College and the University of Prince Edward Island, having studied business and tourism. She was the recipient of several awards and scholarships for ranking highest in the Business Administration program at UPEI and for demonstrating to an outstanding degree qualities of scholarship and leadership within the University community.

Before entering political life, Minister Jameson spent several years working in professional roles with a focus in community investment, human resources and accounting. She is a dedicated volunteer having left her mark on charities and not-for-profits across Canada, including women’s shelters, the United Way and Ronald McDonald House.

Natalie was proud to return home to the Island to raise her young family. Natalie, her husband Dennis, and their sons William and Henry live in Hillsborough Park.

Political career 
Natalie was elected as the MLA for District 9, Charlottetown-Hillsborough Park in the deferred election held on July 15, 2019. Minister Jameson has served as Minister of Education and Lifelong Learning since January 2021, and the Minister responsible for the Status of Women since February 2020.

Minister Jameson’s Cabinet roles have included Minister of Environment, Water and Climate Change; Minister responsible for Charlottetown; member of the PEI Special Committee on Climate Change; member of the PEI Special Committee on Poverty in PEI; member of the Cabinet Committee on Policy and Priorities.; and member of the Treasury Board.

Electoral record

Roles

Committees

References 

Living people
Progressive Conservative Party of Prince Edward Island MLAs
Women MLAs in Prince Edward Island
People from Charlottetown
21st-century Canadian politicians
Year of birth missing (living people)
21st-century Canadian women politicians